The Last Days of Pompeii is the debut studio album by the American alternative rock band Nova Mob, a band formed by former Hüsker Dü drummer Grant Hart. It was released on February 22, 1991 by Rough Trade. The album was remixed and reissued by Con d’Or on January 11, 2011 with bonus tracks and new album cover art. It is a concept album about rocket scientist Wernher von Braun escaping the end of World War II by time-travelling back to Pompeii and the eruption of Mount Vesuvius in AD 79.

The album received mixed reviews with John Aizelwood of Q Magazine noting "fine in itself, but the past is still too great a burden".

Plot 
In 1990, Grant Hart told British magazine Select, "It starts out narrated by Pliny the Younger from Pompeii, OK? ... He pretty much gives the general synopsis. The story starts with the fall of Nazi Germany, and Wernher Von Braun doesn't wanna be captured. So he conjures up Wotan, the Nordic God of War, and asks him, like, How the hell do I get out of this mess?" Escaping back in time in a V2 rocket, von Braun meets Pliny the Elder who takes him to Pompeii. He ends up with King Pompedible (from the illustrated book, The Knave of Hearts) trying to control his mind, just as Hitler had tried before. "He slowly comes to the realisation that he's going to be manipulated, no matter what he does. He leaves again, but it's not altogether clear how. It's more or less a transcendental thing involving the eruption (of Vesuvius) - the eruption wakes him up from a sodium pentathol-induced dream."

Track listing 

 Demos recorded February 14–16, 1990 at Underground Studios, Minneapolis

Personnel
 Grant Hart –  vocals, guitar, keyboards, production, remixing (2010 reissue)
 Tom Merkl – bass, production
 Michael Crego – drums, production
 Dave Kent – production, engineering
 Steve Noonan – assistant engineering
 Brent Sigmeth – remixing (2010 reissue)
 Neil Wier – remixing (2010 reissue)
 T.Roberts – engineering (1990 demos)

Notes

1991 debut albums
Concept albums
Rough Trade Records albums
Grant Hart albums